

Incumbents 
 Monarch: Go-Nara

Events 
 August 25 – The first Europeans and firearms arrive in Japan

Births 
January 31 - Tokugawa Ieyasu (d. 1616), shōgun
February 16 – Kanō Eitoku, Japanese painter (d. 1590)

References

 
1540s in Japan
Japan
Years of the 16th century in Japan